Reclining Figure 1969–70 (LH 608) is a bronze sculpture by English artist Henry Moore.

History
The maquette was used to create a full-size version in polystyrene, which was used to create a mould for a monumental sculpture.

The sculpture can be viewed as an abstraction of a reclining female human figure, resting on one arm, hip and two legs, with the second arm raised, and a prominence on the chest suggesting a breast.  It has no evident face.

Six full-size copies were cast in 1969 and early 1970, at the Noack factory in Berlin, and an artist's copy was cast shortly before Moore's death in 1986. One cast was exhibited in a major retrospective of his work at the Forte di Belvedere in Florence in 1972, later described by Moore as the pinnacle of his career.

The artist's cast (0/6) was stolen from the Henry Moore Foundation at Perry Green, Hertfordshire on 15 December 2005. It is believed to have been hoisted onto the back of a stolen flatbed Mercedes lorry using a crane, cut up for scrap the same night, and shipped to Rotterdam, and then probably to the Far East.  The sculpture was estimated to be worth £3m, but only £1,500 as scrap.  The theft inspired German artist Fritz Balthaus in 2009 to cast bronze ingots of equivalent weight which, arranged in a  form approximating Moore's sculpture, are displayed as Pure Moore at the Federal Criminal Police Office in Berlin.

See also
List of sculptures by Henry Moore
List of heists in the United Kingdom
Two-Piece Reclining Figure No. 9
Two-Piece Reclining Figure: Points

References

External links 
 £3m Henry Moore sculpture stolen, BBC News, 17 December 2005
 Image, Henry Moor Foundation
 Mystery of the stolen Moore solved, The Observer, Sunday 17 May 2009
 Lost Art: Henry Moore, Tate Gallery, 6 August 2012
 Mystery of the stolen Moore solved, The Guardian, 17 May 2009
 Israel Public Art
 Louisiana Museum of Modern Art, Henry Moore Foundation
 Hakone Open-Air Museum, Henry Moore Foundation
 Tel Aviv Museum of Art, Henry Moore Foundation
 Art theft: some of the famous art heists of the last 100 years, The Telegraph
 Celebrating Moore: Works from the Collection of the Henry Moore Foundation, p. 39-40
 Gallery of Lost Art

1970 sculptures
Bronze sculptures
Modernist sculpture
Sculptures by Henry Moore
Columbia University campus
Stolen works of art
Robberies in the United Kingdom